The Milton Main Post Office is a historic post office building at 499 Adams Street in Milton, Massachusetts.  The single-story granite building was built in 1936 out of locally quarried stone.  The building is roofed in copper and has a wooden tower with louvered side panels and copper roofing.  The interior public lobby has terrazzo marble flooring, and white marble wainscoting, with the walls above finished in plaster.  The ceiling is ringed by an ornamental plaster cornice.  One wall is decorated by a mural depicting scenes of the American Revolution painted by Elizabeth Tracy and funded by the Treasury Section of Painting and Sculpture, a Depression-era jobs program.

The building was listed on the National Register of Historic Places in 1986.

Gallery

See also 

National Register of Historic Places listings in Milton, Massachusetts
List of United States post offices

References 

Government buildings completed in 1936
Milton
Colonial Revival architecture in Massachusetts
Buildings and structures in Norfolk County, Massachusetts
Milton, Massachusetts
National Register of Historic Places in Milton, Massachusetts